Events from the year 1818 in Russia

Incumbents
 Monarch – Alexander I

Events

  
 
  
  
 
 
  
 Asiatic Museum
 Otechestvennye Zapiski

Births

 - Alexander II of Russia, Emperor of Russia. (d. 1881)

Deaths

References

1818 in Russia
Years of the 19th century in the Russian Empire